The catamaran Twin City Liner has been a link on the Danube river between the two capitals, Vienna, Austria and Bratislava, Slovakia since 1 June 2006. The path between the two European capitals takes approximately 75 minutes.

History 

The first catamaran was built in Norway between the autumn of 2005 and the spring of 2006. The routing was across Skagerrak, on the Northern Sea after the channel Rhine-Main-Danube to Vienna. For this and due to the weight, the shipyard of Norwegian Båtservice Mandal developed a high speed catamaran in aluminium with a hydrojet which can also be used in summer at low tide. The sinking depth in water guaranteed by the contract is 80 cm. To minimize the impact of the waves, complex model tests of the Austrian Institute for Maritime Technology (Schiffbautechnische Versuchsanstalta) took  place. The catamaran is totally climate-controlled, and can accommodate 106 passengers and crew (a captain, two sailors and catering staff).
On May 14, 2007, the Twin City Liner failed in Vienna, in the district of Erdberg, on the right bank of the Danube Canal and had to be rescued by firemen from Vienna. After repair and administrative authorization, it was returned to service. A similar accident occurred July 28, 2009, when the captain tried to avoid a floating tree trunk near the gateway Erdberg.

During a press conference on August 20, 2007, the Deputy Mayor for Economic Affairs and Finance Vienna Renate Brauner discussed the acquisition of the second Twin City Liner. This second "Twinni," as nicknamed by the media, was also built by Båtservice Mandal and made the same journey.

On May 13, 2008, the Twin City Liner docked in the central port of Vienna below Reichsbrücke. The maiden voyage of the new catamaran, with the registration number A-40631, was conducted immediately after its christening by President Heinz Fischer and his wife Margit Fischer, and the priest of the Cathedral of Vienna Anton Faber, as part of a state visit to Bratislava. During a stopover in Devín, Slovak President Ivan Gasparovic and his wife boarded the ship and then continued the journey.

Besides minor changes to the technical equipment and form, the new Twin City Liner can accommodate up to 126 passengers: 106 seats forward in the passenger cabin, eight seats in the "VIP" cabin on the upper deck and twelve outdoor seats for travel during the summer. The commercial operation of the second Twin City Liner began 31 August 2008.

There have been studies conducted for the purchase of a third vessel to develop a fast connection based on the Twin City Liner to Budapest or Belgrade. From Bratislava, travelers might go to Piestany or contemporary art museum Danubiana Meulensteen Art Museum to Čunovo.

In January 2019, it was announced that a new, larger Twin City Liner would begin operating on March 29, 2019. This Twin City Liner was built in England by Wightshipyard. It took 62,000 working hours, 25 tons of aluminium, and 60 square meters of window glass to complete the 7 million euro vessel. It is powered by four Di16 V8 Scania 4400BHP Ehardt engines, and four Kamewa Rolls-Royce jets.

Twin City Liner 3

Length : 39.9 meters

Width : 11 meters

Height : 5.9 meters

Draft : 0.8 meters

Dead weight : 70 tons

Seats : 250

Captain's Lounge: 35

Top speed : 81 km / h

Cruise speed : 60 km / h

Power : 4400 hp

Route and timetables 
Unlike most other ships sailing on the Danube, the Twin City Liner does not leave the port of Reichsbrücke but the station in the city center, on the Danube canal between Schwedenplatz and Marienbrücke (Vienna) to bypass the dam of the power plant Freudenau. In July 2010, a new wharf was opened.

The arrival point in Bratislava is only a few minutes walk from the old town.

The ships sail from May to September four to five times a day in each direction, and in April and October, three to four times. Besides the planned operating hours (evenings and from mid - December to April), ships can be chartered.

Users 
Users are mainly tourists and inhabitants of Vienna and Bratislava, mostly businessmen. As seats are limited booking favors roundtrips between morning and evening. In addition, the ticket price depends on the day of the week.

Owner 
The ship owner is the Central Danube Region GmbH, which initiated and developed the project. The partners are as operators DDSG Blue Danube, belonging to the Wien Holding which includes the businesses run by the city of Vienna.

Image gallery

References

External links 

 
 DDSG Blue Danube Schifffahrt GmbH

Transport in Bratislava
Transport in Vienna
Passenger ships